Chimyon is an urban-type settlement in Fergana Region, Uzbekistan. It is the seat of Fergana District. Its population was 2,447 people in 1989, and 3,300 in 2016.

References

Populated places in Fergana Region
Urban-type settlements in Uzbekistan